Pontage was a term for a toll levied for the building or repair of bridges dating to the medieval era in England, Wales and Ireland. 

Pontage was similar in nature to murage (a toll for the building of town walls) and pavage (a toll for paving streets and market places, or—more rarely—roads between towns). 

Pontage was granted by the king by letters patent for a limited term, sufficient to enable the requisite public works to be done. However, sometimes the works were not completed (or at least not paid for) by the end of the term, so that a renewal had to be obtained. Grants were made from 1228 until the 1440s, the earliest being for bridges at Ferrybridge, Yorkshire and Staines, an important crossing of the river Thames. In all about 370 grants were made. In the Lordship of Ireland, grants of pontage were used to build bridges in many towns, including Clonmel, Kilcullen and Leighlinbridge.

The term pontage is also applied to lands in Cambridgeshire, which were liable to repair the bridge of Cambridge as an incident of tenure.

References

 

Toll (fee)
Bridges in England
Taxation in medieval England
History of Cambridgeshire
Toll bridges in England